Table tennis at the 2006 South American Games was held from March 21 to March 26. All games were played at River Plate Club in Buenos Aires, Argentina.

Medalists

References

2006 South American Games events
South American Games
2006